Raffaello Tancredi (Resina, 1837 – Naples, 1916) was an Italian painter, mainly of historical subjects.

Biography
He was a pupil of the Academy of Fine Arts of Naples, obtained a three-year (1864–67) state-funded  stipend to travel to Florence; in 1868 he exhibited a canvas: Buoso da Doaro recognized by his fellow citizens. At this competition both Tancredi and Alessandro Focosi, were awarded the first prize. At the Exposition Nazionale of Milan, in 1872, he exhibited il Caracciolo, who tradition holds that Francesco Caracciolo was arrested by the forces of the Papal States, due to the treason of a servant.

Tancredi became a professor at the Academy of Fine Arts and was knighted into the Order of the Crown of Italy.

Other works

Other major works by Tancredi are: 
The gentlemen in the Boboli Gardens in the past century
  Go to gain
 Paisiello jailed for writing a Republican hymn, is released by musicians of Russian regiments stationed in Naples
 The auctioneer of wine in Naples
 For markets of the East
 White slave men
Pirates
The punctured pocket
 Pope Julius II on the walls of the conquered city of Mirandola
 The youth of Ferdinand IV
Famous music teacher jailed.

References

1837 births
1890 deaths
19th-century Neapolitan people
19th-century Italian painters
Italian male painters
Painters from Naples
19th-century Italian male artists